The DeSoto Next Generation Solar Energy Center is a photovoltaic power station in Arcadia, DeSoto County, in the U.S. state of Florida, owned by Florida Power & Light (FPL).
President Barack Obama attended the plant's commissioning on October 27, 2009. It has a nameplate capacity of 25 megawatts (MW), and produces an estimated 42,000 megawatt hours (MW·h) of electricity per year (an average output of about 4.8 MW).

The plant cost $150 million to construct.

FPL has to get a permit for construction of the second stage and had filed for the permit to build the third stage of the plant. At the second stage, 49 MW of capacity will be added. At the third stage, 226 MW of capacity is planned to be added bringing the total capacity of the plant up to 300 MW.

Production

See also

 Solar power in the United States
 Space Coast Next Generation Solar Energy Center

References

External links 
 

Photovoltaic power stations in the United States
Buildings and structures in DeSoto County, Florida
NextEra Energy
Power stations in Florida
2009 establishments in Florida
Energy infrastructure completed in 2009